Milpara is a north-western suburb of Albany in southern Western Australia. Its local government area is the City of Albany.

References

Suburbs of Albany, Western Australia